The Rung languages are a proposed branch of Sino-Tibetan languages. The branch was proposed by Randy LaPolla on the basis of morphological evidence such as pronominal paradigms. However, Guillaume Jacques and Thomas Pellard (2021) argues that these languages do not constitute a monophyly based on recent phylogenetic studies and on a thorough investigation of shared lexical innovations.

LaPolla (2003) lists the following languages as part of his provisional "Rung" group.

Rung
Rgyalrongic (also often included into the Qiangic branch)
Nungish
T'rung (Dulong)
Anong
Rawang
Kiranti
West Himalayan (Kinauri-Almora)
Kinauri
Almora
Kham
Magar
Chepang

Kham, Magar, and Chepangic have also been proposed to form part of a Greater Magaric group.

References

 Thurgood, Graham and Randy J. LaPolla (eds.) (2003). The Sino-Tibetan Languages. London: Routledge. .

es:Lenguas rung